The first USS Chicago (later CA-14) was a protected cruiser of the United States Navy, the largest of the original three authorized by Congress for the "New Navy" and one of the U.S. Navy's first four steel ships.

She was launched on 5 December 1885 by Delaware River Iron Ship Building and Engine Works of Chester, Pennsylvania, sponsored by Edith Cleborne (daughter of Navy Medical Director Cuthbert J. Cleborne) and commissioned on 17 April 1889.

Design and construction
These were the first steel-hulled ships of the "New Navy". All were ordered from the same shipyard, Delaware River Iron Ship Building and Engine Works of Chester, Pennsylvania. However, when Secretary of the Navy William C. Whitney initially refused to accept Dolphin, claiming her design was defective, the Roach yard went bankrupt and Chicagos completion was delayed about three years while Roach reorganized as the Delaware River Iron Ship Building and Engine Works. Like the other "ABCD" ships, Chicago was built with a sail rig to increase cruising range.

She was also rigged with sails as a barque. Chicago was capable of carrying  of coal.

Chicagos original armament consisted of four /30 caliber Mark 2 guns, eight /30 caliber Mark 2 guns, two /31 caliber Mark 1 guns, two 6-pounder  guns, four 3-pounder  guns, two 1-pounder  Hotchkiss revolver cannon, and two .45 caliber (11.4 mm) Gatling guns.

Rebuilds and refits
In 1895–99 Chicago was refitted at the New York Navy Yard, with her main batteries replaced by four new /35 caliber Mark 4 guns, and with all secondary 6-inch and 5-inch guns replaced by fourteen new /40 caliber Mark 3 guns. She had her sails removed, boilers replaced by six Babcock & Wilcox and four cylindrical boilers, and engines replaced with two horizontal triple-expansion engines totaling  for  speed. In 1915 as a training ship she was rearmed with twelve /40 caliber guns, and in 1918 as a flagship with four /51 caliber guns. In 1920, as a submarine tender at Pearl Harbor, she was disarmed.

Service history

Pre-World War I

On 7 December 1889, Chicago departed Boston for Lisbon, Portugal, arriving on 21 December. The cruiser served in European and Mediterranean waters as the flagship of the Squadron of Evolution until 31 May 1890, when she sailed from Funchal, Madeira to call at Brazilian and West Indian ports before returning to New York on 29 July.

Chicago operated along the east coasts of North and South America and in the Caribbean as flagship of the Squadron of Evolution—and later as flagship of the North Atlantic Squadron—until 1893. After taking part in the International Naval Review in Hampton Roads in April, she left New York on 18 June 1893 to cruise in European and Mediterranean waters as flagship of the European station. During this period the ship was commanded by Alfred Thayer Mahan, already famous as a naval strategist. Chicago returned to New York on 20 March 1895, and was placed out of commission there on 1 May.

Recommissioned on 1 December 1898, Chicago made a short cruise in the Caribbean before sailing for the European Station on 18 April. She returned to New York on 27 September and participated in the naval parade and Dewey celebration of 2 October 1899. Chicago sailed from New York on 25 November for an extended cruise, as flagship of the South Atlantic Station until early July 1901, then as flagship of the European Station. With the squadron, she cruised in northern European, Mediterranean, and Caribbean waters until 1 August 1903, when she proceeded to Oyster Bay, New York, and the Presidential Review.

From 3 December 1903 – 15 August 1904, Chicago was out of commission at Boston undergoing repairs. After operating along the northeast coast, the cruiser departed Newport News on 17 November for Valparaíso, Chile, arriving on 28 December. There, on 1 January 1905, she relieved the armored cruiser  as flagship of the Pacific Squadron and for three years operated off the west coasts of North and South America, in the Caribbean, and to Hawaii. In 1906, she played a key role in the evacuation of San Francisco during the 1906 San Francisco earthquake. Arriving from San Diego at 6pm on 19 April, Chicago'''s radio allowed the city's leadership to communicate with the outside world, as telephone and telegraph lines were down. A group of two officers and sixteen enlisted men from Chicago supervised waterborne evacuation efforts. The removal of 20,000 refugees to Tiburon in Marin County by this ship and numerous other vessels is said to be unparalleled and unsurpassed until the 1940 evacuation of Dunkirk.

On 8 January 1908, Chicago departed San Diego for the east coast and in May joined the Naval Academy Practice Squadron for the summer cruise along the northeast coast until 27 August, when she went into reserve. Chicago was recommissioned the next summer (14 May – 28 August 1909) to operate with the Practice Squadron along the east coast, then returned to Annapolis. On 4 January 1910, she left the Academy for Boston, arriving on 23 January. She then served "in commission in reserve" with the Massachusetts Naval Militia until 12 April 1916, and with the Pennsylvania Naval Militia from 26 April 1916 – April 1917.

World War I and beyond
On 6 April 1917, Chicago was placed in full commission at Philadelphia and reported to Submarine Force, Atlantic (COMSUBLANT) as flagship at New London, Connecticut, commanded by future Admiral Thomas C. Hart. On 10 July 1919, she departed New York to join Cruiser Division 2 (CruDiv 2), as flagship in the Pacific. She was reclassified CA-14 in 1920 and then CL-14 in 1921. From December 1919 – September 1923, she served with SubDiv 14 and as tender at the Naval Submarine Base Pearl Harbor.Chicago was decommissioned at Pearl Harbor on 30 September 1923 and served as a receiving ship at Naval Submarine Base Pearl Harbor until 1935. On 16 July 1928 she was renamed Alton to free the name Chicago for the heavy cruiser  and was reclassified as an "unclassified miscellaneous unit" (IX-5).Alton was sold on 15 May 1936. She foundered in mid-Pacific on 8 July 1936 while being towed from Honolulu to San Francisco for delivery to her buyers.

Gallery

References

Bibliography
 Rentfrow, James C. Home Squadron: The U.S. Navy on the North Atlantic Station. Annapolis, Maryland: Naval Institute Press, 2014.  
 Spears, John Randolph. A History of the United States Navy. New York: C. Scribner's Sons, 1908. The White Squadron''.  Toledo, Ohio: Woolson Spice Co., 1891.

External links

Photo gallery of USS CHICAGO (Protected Cruiser) at NavSource.org
Navy photograph of Chicago
Additional Chicago info
Journal of the Cruise of U.S.S. Chicago, 1893–1895 MS 408 held by Special Collection & Archives ,     Nimitz Library  at the United States Naval Academy 

1885 ships
Protected cruisers of the United States Navy
World War I cruisers of the United States
1906 San Francisco earthquake
Maritime incidents in 1936
Ships built by the Delaware River Iron Ship Building and Engine Works
Shipwrecks in the Pacific Ocean
Spanish–American War cruisers of the United States
Philippine–American War ships of the United States